ʿAnss District, also spelled ʿAns, is a district of the Dhamar Governorate, Yemen. As of 2003, the district had a population of 119,124 inhabitants.

History 
The 9th-century writer Ya'qubi listed ʿAns as one of the 84 mikhlafs (administrative divisions) of Yemen. It was a tribal region named after ʿAns b. Mālik, and contained the towns of Thāt and Bishār.

References

Districts of Dhamar Governorate